Eltham railway station is located on the Hurstbridge line in Victoria, Australia. It serves the north-eastern Melbourne suburb of Eltham, and opened on 5 June 1902.

Eltham is the terminus for a number of peak and off-peak services on the line. Five stabling sidings are located to the west of Platform 2, with the site previously having been a goods yard. The last timber trestle bridge on the Melbourne suburban network is located to the south of the station.

History
Eltham station opened on 5 June 1902, when the railway line from Heidelberg was extended. It remained a terminus until June 1912, when the line was extended to Hurstbridge. Like the suburb itself, the station is named after the district of Eltham in Kent, England.

In 1960, Platform 1 was converted from a south-facing bay platform to a through platform, with a connection to the main line provided at the down end of the station. Also in that year, the current station building was provided. In 1969, flashing light signals were provided at the Diamond Street level crossing, located nearby in the down direction from the station.

In 1977, a ramped goods platform was abolished, with a goods shed believed to be demolished around the same time. By 1984, goods traffic to and from the station ceased. In 1987, boom barriers were provided at the Diamond Street level crossing.

On 4 July 1996, Eltham was upgraded to a Premium Station. A minor refurbishment of the station also occurred during this time.

On 25 December 2011, following a large storm and subsequent flooding, parts of the line at the down end of the level crossing were washed away. The flooding also eroded a culvert, exposing a small timber bridge.

Eltham was one of the last stations in Melbourne to be controlled by mechanical safeworking, including the use of semaphore signals. It was also a break between two different types of safeworking: Greensborough to Eltham was controlled by miniature electric staff, whilst Eltham to Hurstbridge was controlled by train staff and ticket. Both safeworking systems were converted to Automatic Track Control (ATC) in early 2013. A new amenities building for train drivers was constructed around that time, as well as an upgrade to the stabling sidings.

On 15 May 2019, the Level Crossing Removal Project announced that planning for the duplication of the line between Eltham and Greensborough was underway, with the project expected to start in late 2021. The timber trestle bridge will not be affected by the project.

Platforms and services
Eltham has one island platform with two faces. Trains in either direction can depart from either platform, although Hurstbridge bound services almost always depart from Platform 1, and Flinders Street bound services usually depart from Platform 2.

It is served by Hurstbridge line trains.

Platform 1:
  all stations services to Hurstbridge
  all stations and limited express services to Flinders Street

Platform 2:
  all stations and limited express services to Flinders Street
  all stations services to Hurstbridge

Transport links
Dysons operates two routes via Eltham station, under contract to Public Transport Victoria:
 : to Glenroy station (via Lower Plenty)
 : to Glenroy station (via Greensborough)

Kinetic Melbourne operates one SmartBus route via Eltham station, under contract to Public Transport Victoria:
  : Chelsea station – Westfield Airport West

Panorama Coaches operates four routes to and from Eltham station, under contract to Public Transport Victoria:
 : to Warrandyte
 : to Warrandyte
 : to Diamond Creek
 : to Eltham station (Eltham Town Service)

Gallery

References

External links
 Melway map at street-directory.com.au

Premium Melbourne railway stations
Railway stations in Melbourne
Railway stations in Australia opened in 1902
Railway stations in the Shire of Nillumbik